The Portsmouth Red Birds were a minor league baseball club, located in Portsmouth, Ohio. The team played in the Middle Atlantic League between 1936 and 1940. During the club's first two seasons, it was known as the Portsmouth Pirates, as a Class-C affiliate of the Pittsburgh Pirates. In 1937 the team became affiliated with the St. Louis Cardinals and were then renamed the Portsmouth Red Birds.

Notable players

Erskine Mayer, pitcher

Year-by-year record

Baseball teams established in 1935
Baseball teams disestablished in 1940
Defunct minor league baseball teams
Pittsburgh Pirates minor league affiliates
St. Louis Cardinals minor league affiliates
Defunct baseball teams in Ohio
Portsmouth, Ohio
1935 establishments in Ohio
1940 disestablishments in Ohio
Middle Atlantic League teams